The Kazan electoral district was a constituency created for the 1917 Russian Constituent Assembly election.

The electoral district covered the Kazan Governorate. The constituency was assigned 12 seats in the Constituent Assembly.

Notably, local SR party branch was dominated by leftist elements.

A 66% turnout was reported. The Chuvash people largely voted for the SRs. The Tatar voters were split between leftist and rightist lists. In Kazan city itself the Bolsheviks were the most voted party, with 21,118 votes (26.1%), followed by the Kadets with 20,044 votes (24.8%), the SRs with 15,356 votes (18.9%), Muslim Socialists 12,730 votes (15.7%), Orthodox list 3,215 votes (4%), Mensheviks 2,605 votes (3.2%), Muslim Assembly 2,304 votes (2.8%), right-wing SRs 1,681 votes (2.1%), Cooperative-Indepdendent Socialists 802 votes (1%), Chuvash 696 votes (0.8%) and the Agricultural-Artisan-Commercial-Industrial list 508 votes (0.6%). In the Kazan garrison the Bolsheviks got 10,706 votes (40.8%), SRs 9,177 votes (34.9%), Muslim Socialists 3,156 votes (12%), Kadets 1,686 votes (6.4%), Chuvash 577 votes (2.2%), Mensheviks 400 votes (1.5%), right-wing SRs 305 votes (1.2%), Cooperative-Independent Socialists 162 votes (0.6%), Agricultural-Artisan-Commercial Industrial list 51 votes (0.2%), Orthodox list 48 votes (0.1%) and the Muslim Assembly 40 votes (0.1%).

Results

References

Electoral districts of the Russian Constituent Assembly election, 1917